Cambodia competed at the 2012 Summer Paralympics in London, United Kingdom, from August 29 to September 9.

The country is fielding its smallest delegation to date: a single athlete, female sprinter Thin Seng Hon. As no Cambodian athlete qualified for the Games, the country received a wildcard invitation to send one competitor in track and field events.

Thin "was born without a fully formed right leg", and uses a "$2 500 J-shaped running blade" prosthetic. Her coach, pointing out that her prosthetic is "not custom-built for sprinting and is less comfortable and shock absorbent than those owned by her first world rivals", has argued she is likely to be disadvantaged by a "technology gap", as well as by poverty; Thin "trains on a dirt track and balances running with a full-time job at a souvenir shop".

Athletics

Thin Seng Hon competed in the women's 100m and women's 200m T44 (a category for lower limb amputees running with a prosthetic).

See also
Summer Paralympic disability classification
Cambodia at the Paralympics
Cambodia at the 2012 Summer Olympics

Notes

Nations at the 2012 Summer Paralympics
2012
Paralympics